The University of Manitoba Libraries (UML) is the academic library system for the University of Manitoba. UML is made up of over a dozen libraries across two campuses—the main campus (Fort Garry) and the urban, health sciences campus (Bannatyne)—as well as one virtual library, the Winnipeg Regional Health Authority Virtual Library. It is also a member of the U15 Group of Canadian Research Universities.

The largest library of the university is the Elizabeth Dafoe Library.

UML is located in Winnipeg, Manitoba, on Treaty 1 territory, the land of the Anishinaabeg, Cree, Oji-Cree, Dakota, and Dene Peoples, and on the homeland of the Métis Nation.

History 
In 1885, the University of Manitoba acquired nearly 5,000 books from Alexander Kennedy Isbister, who died in 1883, gifted his books to the university in his last will and testament. This body of records, along with approximately $600 of scientific books, made up the bulk of the university's library. At the time, the University of Manitoba rented space to house the books in the McIntyre Block in Winnipeg's Exchange District, as the university did not have a library to house the books, or a librarian to look after them. Unfortunately, in 1898, the entirety of the library was lost in a fire that destroyed the McIntyre Block.

In 1904, the first official library was established at the University of Manitoba in the Faculty of Science. During this time, the Faculty of Science's Professor Frank Allen was appointed the honorary librarian and a new collection of books was accumulated through various sources, including the Royal Society of London, the British and Canadian governments, the Smithsonian Institution, as well as through internal sources, including professors and university associations (like the University of Manitoba Menorah Society). Shortly after, Professor Allen hired an assistance, Florence Davy Thompson was appointed, and an annual sum of money was set aside by the University Council for books and journals. In 1907, Thompson became the first librarian of the university.

In 1915, following Thompson's death, Alexandra Law took over the position for a six-month period. Following her term, Mr. Lowe, of the Botany Department, took over the position in the interim, until Franke E. Nuttal was hired in the fall of 1916. At this time, the library held approximately 16,000 volumes, spread across multiple offices and departments.

St. Paul's College affiliated with the University of Manitoba in 1931, and four years later, the St. Paul's College Free Lending and Reading Library officially began as an aid to the students of the college.

In 1935, towards the end of Nuttal's role as University Librarian, a Carnegie Corporation grant allowed for the creation of a junior library in the university's administration building. At that time, the university had two campuses—Fort Garry and Broadway—and its library holdings were spread out across multiple buildings at either campus.

In 1937, Julie Annette Elizabeth Dafoe (daughter of John W. Dafoe) became Head Librarian of the University of Manitoba, holding the position until 1960.

In 1940, the founder of St. Paul's College, Most Reverend Archbishop Sinnott, officiated the formal opening of the library to the public. (The library at this point contained 2000 holdings.) By 1946, the college formally established its own Library Guild, the principle mandate of which was to raise funds for more acquisitions and to increase the number of library patrons.

In the early 1950s, these libraries were collectively staffed by 22 people and held approximately 150,000 volumes and acquired on average 6,000 volumes per year. Study spaces were increasingly difficult to find, particularly during exam time when "standing room only was the rule in the libraries." To support the growing needs of the university, and in celebration of the university's 75th anniversary in 1952, a new central library on the Fort Garry campus was constructed. Dafoe, still the head librarian at this time, helped plan for the development of the new library, which would open in 1953 baring her name: Elizabeth Dafoe Library. The library acquired its 1-millionth volume in 1976; and in 1997, it would acquire its 2-millionth book: Voyages and Travels of an Indian Interpreter and Trader, authored by John Long.

In 1958, with its 20,000 books, St. Paul's College moved to the University of Manitoba campus. The following year, Father Harold Drake became head librarian, holding the position until 1992, when he retired. A year later, in 1993, the library was named in his honour and remains the current name of the St. Paul's library.

Libraries 
Today, the University of Manitoba Libraries include over a dozen libraries serving its various faculties and departments.

Services 
UML supports research across the university by providing various services, including access to reference services, service desks, self-serve kiosks, media spaces, individual or group study spaces, and workshops. The Libraries further provide access to books, journals, articles, newspapers, government publications, online databases, e-journals, theses and dissertations, etc. University students, staff, and alumni have access to the Libraries services. Members of the general public can obtain borrowing privileges by purchasing a citizen borrower's card.

Services include:

 Data Management — UML assists researchers in organizing their data and ensuring it remains accessible over time by providing data management consultations.
 Digitization — Scanners throughout the Libraries can be used free of charge by students and staff for self-serve digitization. The Libraries' Research Services and Digital Strategies unit also offers fee-based digitization services for students, staff, and the general public.
 MSpace — MSpace is an institutional repository which stores faculty and student publications, including theses, dissertations, working papers, reports, etc.
 Subject Help — UML subject guides provide useful resources related to specific subjects, fields and disciplines, including related sources, databases, and research tips. Subject guides further provide students with the opportunity to contact and/or meet with specific Librarians specializing in those subjects.
 Workshops — UML offers GradSteps workshops to assist graduate students in various ways. Workshops cover topics such as data collection and analysis, communication skills, grant writing, financial planning, networking, research ethics, citing, reference management, using library resources, GIS and data visualization.

Collections

UM Digital Collections 
In 2013, the University of Manitoba Libraries launched their UM Digital Collections website. The digital asset management system provides access to over 75,000 rare books, newspapers, photographs, audio-visual content, and other textual records. The platform allows users to browse and search content, and download content in multiple access and preservation formats. Digital collections include a full run of the Winnipeg Tribune Newspaper, the University of Manitoba Brown and Gold Year Books, séance photos by Thomas Glendenning Hamilton, and the records of the Manitoba Gay & Lesbian Archives.

References

Further reading 

 Bumsted, J. 2014. Dictionary of Manitoba Biography. Winnipeg: University of Manitoba Press.

Libraries
Libraries in Manitoba